The World Dog Show is a Fédération Cynologique Internationale-sanctioned, four- to six-day-long international dog show, held yearly since 1971. It has been called "the most important dog show in the world". The World Show includes agility, obedience, junior handler, conformation, and other events and demonstrations. Dogs who win in any category are awarded the title "World Winner". The show places a special emphasis on rare and unusual dog breeds. It is one of the largest dog shows in the world, with shows attracting upwards of 10,000 entrants. It is held in a different country each year.

The top title at the event is Certificat d'Aptitude au Championnat International de Beauté (French for 'Certificate of Aptitude at the International Championship of Beauty'), abbreviated CACIB, for which only purebred specimens of fully recognised, standardised breeds, not provisionally recognised or experimental breeds, may qualify. Some people feel that a win at the World Dog Show is worth more, reputation-wise, than the same win at the Westminster Kennel Club show. Entries in the World Show are from Fédération Cynologique Internationale member clubs, and non-member clubs (such as the American Kennel Club) by invitation.

Show locations and conformation show winners

References

External links

Dog shows and showing